Dublanc Football Club (also known as Dublanc Sports Club and, previously, Dublanc Strikers Sports Club) is a Dominica football club based in Dublanc, Dominica who plays their home games in Roseau, Dominica. The club competes in the Dominica Premiere League, the top tier of Dominica football.

Honors 
Dominica Premiere League: 3
 2005 (as Dublanc Strikers SC), 2016, 2017.

Stadium
Currently the team plays at the 12000 capacity Windsor Park Cricket Stadium.

References

External links
Soccerway profile

Football clubs in Dominica